The Red Moon was a Nazi club formed in 1935, by Palestinian-Arabs in Haifa in British-controlled Mandatory Palestine. 

After the Federation of Arab Youth in Palestine petitioned Adolf Hitler to help them prevent the Jews from obtaining additional land in Palestine, Arab youths in Haifa formed the Red Moon club, which was financially supported by Hitler's regime. Nazi agents had, at the time, been active in the area, attempting to incite the Arabs against the Jews.

It was described in the Jewish Daily Bulletin as "another manifestation of an intensive Nazi anti-Semitic activity sponsored by the Hitler government, and which has broken out throughout Palestine and the Near East." Hitler's birthday was "celebrated in the club in Haifa".

This was one of other  Nazi Party branches in the region.

References

1935 establishments
Nazism